The Chalk Cliff and Republican River is a conservation area in Webster County, Nebraska near Red Cloud, Nebraska which was listed on the National Register of Historic Places in 1982.

It preserves a landscape area written about by Willa Cather.

Included are "chalk cliffs", which are exposed bluffs along the south edge of the Republican River, and a portion of the river.

It is located 1 mile south of Red Cloud.

References

National Register of Historic Places in Webster County, Nebraska